Camilo Daza Álvarez (June 25, 1898 – March 18, 1975) was a Colombian aviator. He was born in Pamplona, Colombia. In 1919, he became the first Colombian to pilot an airplane, and is considered to be the founder of Colombian aviation. He held the rank of brigadier general in the Colombian Air Force.

The Camilo Daza International Airport in Cúcuta is named after him, and displays a statue honoring his contributions. Also, the air base serving Comando Aéreo de Transporte Militar (CATAM) is named in his honor.

References 

Colombian Air Force
Colombian generals
Colombian aviators
1898 births
1975 deaths
People from Pamplona, Norte de Santander